The Air-Eaters Strike Back! is a 1981 board game published by Metagaming Concepts.

Gameplay
The Air-Eaters Strike Back! is a sequel to Invasion of the Air-eaters in which the battle has extended beyond Earth to other nearby planets in the solar system.

Reception
William A. Barton reviewed The Air-Eaters Strike Back! in The Space Gamer No. 44. Barton commented that "The Air-Eaters Strike Back! is a strong initial offering for the new metagames and an enjoyable SF game, either as a sequel to Invasion or in its own right."

References

Board games introduced in 1981
Metagaming Concepts games